This is a listing of artists and bands who have performed at a Big Day Out music festival, listed by year. Big Day Out began in 1992 in Sydney and has expanded to include several Australian venues and Auckland, New Zealand. Each year, the line-up of artists changes, generally maintaining rock as the focus, but also featuring hip-hop, electronica and blues and roots artists. The line ups have included Nirvana, Metallica, Pearl Jam, Foo Fighters, Chemical Brothers, Tool, Blink-182, Marilyn Manson, Muse, Hole, Nine Inch Nails and Red Hot Chili Peppers, while also promoting local Australian and New Zealand artists such as Spiderbait, Regurgitator, Powderfinger, Grinspoon, Silverchair and The Living End.


1992

Notes
A  The Welcome Mat were the first band to perform for the day, and thus became the first band to perform at any Big Day Out festival.

1993

Notes
 The above multi-city big stage artists confirmed by multiple sources such as the now defunct Big Day Out Website. Small stage bands confirmed in Howarth (2006).

1994

Notes
 1994 Small stage bands above as listed in Howarth (2006)
 Auckland bands confirmed by advertisement posted to Kiwi Concert Date Archive 1994

1995

Notes
A  Oasis were originally named in the lineup, but cancelled after Liam Gallagher lost his voice.
 1995 Small stage bands above as listed in Howarth (2006)

1996

Notes
 1996 Small stage bands above as listed in Howarth (2006)

1997

Notes
A  Sepultura were originally named in the lineup, but cancelled after Max Cavalera left the band in December 1996. Sepultura were replaced by Fear Factory.
 1997 Small stage bands above as listed in Howarth (2006)

1998
Big Day Out was not held in 1998.

1999

Notes
 1999 Small stage bands above as listed in Howarth (2006)

2000

Notes
A  Mr. Bungle was originally going to appear, but was "kicked off" the festival due to an ongoing dispute with Red Hot Chili Peppers.

2001

Notes
A  Originally, Limp Bizkit was scheduled to headline the tour and appear at all locations, however after the death of a crowd member at the Sydney show, the group chose to withdraw from the remaining shows of the tour.

2002

2003

2004

Notes
A  American band A Perfect Circle withdrew from the lineup, while the group Fear Factory appeared as a mystery artist playing in place of all of A Perfect Circle's scheduled performances.

2005

2006

Notes
A  AFI, Mylo and Jean Grae withdrew from all scheduled performances in Big Day Out 2006.

2007

Notes
A  Tool's performance in Auckland featured Serj Tankian of System of a Down for the song "Sober"

2008

Notes
A  Björk was forced to pull out her performance at the Sydney Big Day Out under doctor's orders following swelling on her vocal cords.

2009

Notes
A  Fantômas appeared at all shows performing their album The Director's Cut in its entirety.
B  The Vines were forced to cancel all shows due to singer Craig Nicholls state of mental health.

2010

The first official line-up for the 2010 installment was posted on the Big Day Out website just before midnight 28 September 2009. The second official line-up for the 2010 installment was posted on the Big Day Out website just before midnight 11 November 2009. The full line-up was as follows

Notes
A  Tumbleweed only appeared at Sydney on Saturday 23rd. - incorrect - they played Friday 22nd also on the Hot Produce stage as they did the next day Saturday 23 January 2010.
B  Beenie Man was withdrawn from lineup by organizers.

2011
The first line-up for the 2011 Big Day Out was officially released via the Big Day Out website at 12:01am 28 September. The second announcement was released on 24 November and completed the 2011 line-up.

For the second year in a row Sydney held two festivals due to increasing popularity of the event.

Official line-up is as follows:

Notes
A  At the Adelaide performance, Tool were joined by Till Lindemann and Christoph Schneider of Rammstein for an extended performance and pyrotechnics display during Lateralus.
B  The Black Keys withdrew from the Big Day Out lineup.
C  Primal Scream appeared at all shows performing their 1991 album Screamadelica in its entirety.
D  New Zealand band Shihad performed their hit album from 1999, The General Electric in its entirety.

2012

The lineup was announced on 29 September 2011. The first 17 artists were announced over the Big Day Out Twitter page from 8 until 10pm. The three main headliners were announced on 30 September 2011 on Triple J. Tony Hawk was announced as a non-musical special guest.

Bold indicates headline act.

Notes
A  Kanye West was originally announced to play all shows, but was later withdrawn from the Auckland, Perth and Adelaide line-ups.
B  Hilltop Hoods were withdrawn from the Perth show.
C  Odd Future were withdrawn from the Auckland show after complaints concerning their homophobic lyrics. They still performed in Auckland, playing a sideshow at the Powerstation the night before.
D  Tony Hawk appeared at all Big Day Out festivals in 2012 performing skate demonstrations.

2013

The first lineup was announced at midnight on 16 July. The Red Hot Chili Peppers were announced shortly before the first lineup announcement. Lucha VaVOOM was announced as a non-musical special guest.

Bold indicates headline act.

Kaskade cancelled Adelaide, Melbourne, and Perth on the festival. Nicky Romero cancelled Perth, but instead played the first four shows on the 2013 tour.

2014

The first lineup was announced at 8:00pm AEST on 31 July.

Bold indicates headline act.

Blur and DIIV withdrew from the 2014 lineup.
Notes
A  With no event in 2015, Cosmic Psychos are the only band to play both the first Big Day Out and the last.

2015
There was no Big Day Out in 2015. It was announced on 26 June 2014 that the 2015 Big Day Out had been cancelled. The announcement came after long-running speculation over the future of the summer festival and revelations the day before from Sydney Showground executives that festival organisers had cancelled their 2015 venue booking.

References

External links
Big Day Out Official Website

Rock festivals in Australia
Rock festivals in New Zealand
Concert tours